William Armstrong Russell (1821–1879) was an Irish Protestant Christian missionary to China, and served as the Anglican Bishop of North China.

Russell, son of Marcus Carew Russell, by Fanny Potts, was born at Ballydavid House, Littleton, County Tipperary, Ireland, in 1821, and was educated at Midleton School, County Cork, and at Trinity College, Dublin. He was ordained by Bishop Charles James Blomfield in 1847, and as a missionary in connection with the Church Missionary Society went to China in that year in company with Robert Henry Cobbold, afterwards archdeacon of Ningbo. These two men were the first Protestant missionaries in Ningbo. Russell translated into the Ningbo dialect the greater part of the New Testament, portions of the Old Testament, and the Book of Common Prayer, besides writing many tracts and essays. He was appointed the first missionary bishop of North China in November 1872, and on 15 December was consecrated in Westminster Abbey. After his return to China he admitted four Chinese to deacons' and priests' orders; he confirmed nearly three hundred Chinese Christians, and dedicated several mission churches.

in 1852 he married Mary Ann, daughter of Charles William Leisk. He died at Shanghai on 5 October 1879.

He published The Term Question, or an Enquiry as to the Term in the Chinese Language which most nearly represents Elohim and Theos, as they are used in the Holy Scriptures,’ Shanghai, 1877.

See also

Diocese of North China
Attribution

1821 births
1879 deaths
Irish expatriate Protestant bishops
Irish translators
Irish Anglican missionaries
19th-century Anglican bishops in China
Anglican missionaries in China
British expatriates in China
Translators of the Bible into Chinese
Christian writers
19th-century translators
People educated at Midleton College
Missionary linguists
Anglican bishops of North China